Stenamma alas is a species of ant which can be found in wet forests of Costa Rica on an elevation of .

Description
It pronotum is feeble and thin and have transverse stretch marks. The species legs are reddish-brown in colour while its head is dorsal on face and have a rugae which is transverse. Its propodeum is identical in brightness to promesonotum while its mesosoma is dark in colour.

Habitat
The species is found on clay banks, along the streams, and on hillsides.

References

External links

Stenamma alas

Myrmicinae
Insects described in 2005
Hymenoptera of North America